Athicholamangalam  is a village in the Kudavasal taluk of Tiruvarur district in Tamil Nadu, India.

Demographics 

As per the 2001 census, Athicholamangalam had a population of 925 with 470 males and 455 females. The sex ratio was 968. The literacy rate was 40.38.

References 

 

Villages in Tiruvarur district